The 1929–30 Polska Liga Hokejowa season was the fourth season of the Polska Liga Hokejowa, the top level of ice hockey in Poland. Three teams participated in the final round, and AZS Warszawa won the championship.

First round

Group A

Group B

Final round

4th place 
Czarni Lwów – AZS Wilno 1:0

External links
 Season on hockeyarchives.info

Polska Hokej Liga seasons
Polska
1929–30 in Polish ice hockey